The Oldsmobile Touring Sedan is a trim level of the eleventh generation Ninety-Eight,a full-size car manufactured and marketed by Oldsmobile from 1987-1993 across two generations, both using the front-wheel drive GM C-platform — itself marking GM's critical transition from rear- to front-drive for its full-size sedans.

As with the Ninety Eight's other trim levels, the Touring Sedan was available soley as a four-door sedan and — paralleling Buick Electra's T-Type variant and Cadillac's DeVille Touring Sedan — which targeted buyers of import sports-luxury sedans, e.g., those from Audi, BMW, Mercedes-Benz and Acura. 

With its nameplate directly recalling the company's earlier "Touring Sedan" models from the 1910s and 1920s, the Touring Sedan reached an overall production of approximately 35,000 and was discontinued after 1993, superseded by the GM H-platform Oldsmobile LSS and the GM G-platform Oldsmobile Aurora.

First generation (1987–1990)
Oldsmobile introduced the Touring Sedan trim late in the 1987 model year  Officially designated the W12 option package, the trim level's final assembly was executed by ASC of Michigan. With a base price of just over $24,000 USD, the Touring Sedan cost roughly 30% more than the most expensive of the Ninety Eights other trim levels.

While sharing the Ninety Eight's LN3 165 hp 3.8L V6 and 4-speed automatic transmission, Oldsmobile equipped the standard Touring Sedan suspension with the FE3 suspension package (also referred to as "Level 3" or Sport Suspension), featuring a larger 32MM front stabilizer bar, an added 18MM rear stabilizer bar, firmer suspension bushings, stiffer springs at all corners, upgraded struts, 15" wheels, performance tires and a special steering gear. It also included the Teves four-wheel anti-lock brake system.

Externally the Touring Sedan used cloisonné badges on the hood, C pillars and rear quarter panel and the lower body featured model-specific dark gray cladding and fog lamps. 

Similarly to other of GM's front-drive, full-size C platform sports-luxury sedan variants (e.g., the Buick Electra's T-Type variant and Cadillac's DeVille Touring Sedan), which offered upgraded, adjustable, supportive seats — the Touring Sedan featured twin bucket seats by Lear Siegler with 16-way power adjustments: power reclining, power side bolster adjustments, power lumbar and thigh adjustments and power articulating headrests. Rear seats mirrored the articulation of the front seats and included an armrest and head restraints. The OTS was the first five-passenger full-size Oldsmobile with a center floor console and floor shifter. 

The interior used genuine burl walnut veneer accents; full analog instrumentation, including 120-mph speedometer, tachometer, oil, volts, coolant temp, and fuel gauges; anti-lock brakes, onboard computer (1988–1990), self-closing trunk (1988–1990), genuine burl walnut veneer interior accents, "basket handle" console shifter, and 15-inch (1987 and 1988) or 16-inch (1989 and 1990) alloy wheels. For 1988, available options included engine block heater, remote fuel door release, automatic door locks and trunk pull down, power moonroof, audio choices, driver information system, and mobile phone pre-wire.

The 1989 model featured gray-painted front, front and rear bumpers matching the side lower body cladding, a 12 aperture grille and headlamp bezels used a matching gray paint. 16-inch "turbine" wheels (shared with the Toronado Troféo) became standard.  Extra cost options for 1989 included engine block heater, power moonroof, Delco/Bose audio system, and CD player. A redesigned steering wheel included redundant HVAC and audio controls. 

Again for 1990, optional features included engine block heater, with power moonroof, and audio choices.  The illuminated steering wheel control buttons now matched the interior color. Also now standard were the auto down driver's window, keyless entry and an electrochromic (auto dimming) rear view mirror.

Second generation (1991–1993)
For 1991, the Oldsmobile Ninety-Eight entered its seventh generation; in place of a stand-alone model, the OTS was reintroduced as a performance-oriented trim level, becoming the Oldsmobile Ninety-Eight Touring. Positioned alongside the Regency as the top-trim Ninety-Eight, the Touring was offered with five-passenger seating and alloy wheels (shared with the LSS).  The two-tone body of the previous generation was replaced with a monochromatic exterior (including a body-color grille); all chrome trim was deleted (with the exception of badging).  

For 1992, a 205 hp supercharged version of the 3.8L V6 became optional, in line with the Buick Park Avenue Ultra, Pontiac Bonneville SSEi, and Oldsmobile LSS. The naturally-aspirated 3.8L V6 produced 170 hp

After the 1993 model year, Oldsmobile removed the Touring trim from the Ninety-Eight model line.  While developed as the direct successor of the two-door Toronado, the four-door Aurora also closely matched the Ninety-Eight in size; leading Oldsmobile to consolidate the model line with the 88 after 1996.  The similar LSS remained in production from 1991 to 1999.

Production

See also
Oldsmobile 98
Oldsmobile Trofeo

References

Setting the Pace: Oldsmobie's First 100 Years, pg 484-487.

Cars introduced in 1987
1990s cars
Touring Sedan
Sedans
Cars discontinued in 1993